Vernon Scott Sale (13 June 1915 – 4 January 1991) was a New Zealand cricketer who played first-class cricket for Auckland from 1934 to 1940.

Life and career
Scott Sale was born in Auckland. When he was three years old, his father, the New Zealand cricketer Ned Sale, died in the influenza epidemic of 1918.

He made his first-class debut in the 1934–35 season. In his second match he came to the crease with Auckland at 252 for 7 in reply to Otago's 278; he made 65 and Auckland totalled 450. He was selected for North Island in the match against South Island at the end of the season and made 16 and 43. However, he appeared in only two matches in the next three seasons.

After serving as twelfth man in the first match of the 1938–39 Plunket Shield, Sale returned to the Auckland team for the second and third matches. Auckland won both matches, and the Shield. In the first match he made 106 (batting at number eight) and 43 not out against Otago. The "diminutive Aucklander" scored his century in 115 minutes of "confident and beautifully timed stroke play". Later that year, on Christmas Day, during the match against Auckland he made 97, the highest score in the match, "a masterly innings lasting 135 minutes" with "powerful off and cover drives, and brilliant hook and pull shots".

After the 1939–40 season, when Auckland won the Plunket Shield and Sale was singled out in The Cricketer as a batsman of "considerable promise", World War II curtailed cricket in New Zealand, and Sale played no more first-class cricket. He umpired two first-class matches in 1947-48 and 1948–49.

He was also a football player. He married Rona Dickey in December 1940. He worked in banking.

See also
 List of Auckland representative cricketers

References

External links
 
Scott Sale at CricketArchive

1915 births
1991 deaths
New Zealand cricketers
Auckland cricketers
Cricketers from Auckland
North Island cricketers